Air Vice-Marshal Lotfi Mustafa Kamal Mohamed Tawfik, commonly known as Lotfi Mustafa Kamal, (born 6 May 1952) was the Egyptian Minister of Civil Aviation and a retired Egyptian Air Force commander.

Personal life 
Kamal entered the Egyptian Air Academy in 1970, graduating in 1972.

Career 
He was Chief of Staff of the EAF from 2009 to 2011.

Notes

References
Egyptian Air Force - Lotfy Mostafa Kamal

|-
 

|-

 

1952 births
Egyptian Air Force air marshals
Civil Aviation ministers of Egypt
Living people
Egyptian Air Academy alumni